Arsinoe is a genus of beetles in the family Carabidae, containing the following species:

 Arsinoe alluaudi Burgeon, 1937  
 Arsinoe biguttata Chaudoir, 1877 
 Arsinoe caffra Peringuey, 1896 
 Arsinoe camerunica Basilewsky, 1970  
 Arsinoe distinguenda Peringuey, 1896 
 Arsinoe elisabethana Burgeon, 1937 
 Arsinoe flavosignata (Gory, 1833) 
 Arsinoe fraterna Peringuey, 1896  
 Arsinoe fulvipes (Fairmaire, 1868) 
 Arsinoe grandis Peringuey, 1899 
 Arsinoe laevigata Basilewsky, 1970 
 Arsinoe lyrata Burgeon, 1937 
 Arsinoe miranda Burgeon, 1937 
 Arsinoe mirei Basilewsky, 1970  
 Arsinoe nigripes Basilewsky, 1970 
 Arsinoe notabilis Peringuey, 1896 
 Arsinoe oneili Barker, 1919  
 Arsinoe plausibilis Peringuey, 1896  
 Arsinoe quadriguttata Castelnau, 1835 
 Arsinoe salvadorensis Kolbe, 1889

References

Lebiinae
Adephaga genera